Arden Must Die is an opera by Alexander Goehr. It premiered on 5 March 1967 at the Hamburg State Opera, conducted by Charles Mackerras and directed by Egon Monk.

The German libretto was written by Erich Fried, with an English version by Geoffrey Skelton. It tells the story of the murder of Thomas Arden by his wife Alice and her lover Mosbie. The libretto draws on two sixteenth-century accounts of the murder, namely the version by chronicler Raphael Holinshed and the anonymous play Arden of Faversham.

The British première was at Sadler's Wells Theatre, London, on 17 April 1974, conducted by Meredith Davies.

References

1967 operas
Cultural depictions of British men
English-language operas
German-language operas
Operas
Operas about politicians
Operas based on plays
Operas based on real people
Operas by Alexander Goehr
Operas set in England
Operas set in the 16th century